Kalidou Coulibaly Yero (born 19 August 1991) is a Senegalese professional footballer who plays as a forward.

Club career
Born in Dakar, Yero made his debut as a senior with FC Istres, then signed with FC Porto in 2009 to complete his development. He was loaned twice during his spell, and also appeared in three competitive games with the club, totalling 57 minutes of play between the Portuguese Cup and the Portuguese League Cup.

Yero joined Gil Vicente F.C. in summer 2011, his maiden appearance in Primeira Liga occurring on 24 October as he came on as a late substitute in a 6–1 away loss against Sporting CP. Two years later, he moved to U.D. Oliveirense of the Segunda Liga, spending his first season on loan.

International career
Yero represented Senegal at the 2012 Summer Olympics, playing all five matches in an eventual quarter-final exit.

Honours
Porto
Taça de Portugal: 2009–10

References

External links

1991 births
Living people
Footballers from Dakar
Senegalese footballers
Association football forwards
Championnat National players
FC Istres players
US Lusitanos Saint-Maur players
Primeira Liga players
Liga Portugal 2 players
Campeonato de Portugal (league) players
FC Porto players
Portimonense S.C. players
U.D. Oliveirense players
Gil Vicente F.C. players
F.C. Penafiel players
S.C. Freamunde players
S.C. Salgueiros players
C.D. Cova da Piedade players
AD Oliveirense players
Clube Oriental de Lisboa players
Malaysia Super League players
PKNP FC players
Stade Lavallois players
Olympic footballers of Senegal
Footballers at the 2012 Summer Olympics
Senegalese expatriate footballers
Expatriate footballers in France
Expatriate footballers in Portugal
Expatriate footballers in Malaysia
Senegalese expatriate sportspeople in France
Senegalese expatriate sportspeople in Portugal
Senegalese expatriate sportspeople in Malaysia